Irony poisoning is a process of normalising extremist views through the use of humour, particularly online.

Definition and use 
Irony poisoning is a process of normalising extremist views through the use of humour, particularly online.

The term is more frequently used by younger people and first appeared in The New York Times in 2018. Irony poisoning is used by people seeking to advance fascism, white supremacy and violence.

Notable examples 
The New York Times used irony poisoning to describe the chain of events that led up to German man Dirk Denkhaus trying to set fire to a house homing refugees after he exchanging racists memes and Nazi greetings online.

In 2022, the Canadian Anti-Hate Network have accused Diagolon of using irony poisoning to desensitise hateful rhetoric through the use of online jokes and memes.

References

External links 

 Irony poisoning- Urban dictionary

Far-right politics
English words and phrases
Political theories